Worksop College (formerly St Cuthbert's College) is a British co-educational private school for both boarding and day pupils  aged 13 to 18, in Worksop. It sits at the northern edge of Sherwood Forest, in Nottinghamshire, England. Founded by Nathaniel Woodard in 1890, the school is a member of the Woodard Corporation and Headmasters' and Headmistresses' Conference, and has a strong Anglo-Catholic tradition.

History
Construction began in 1890 on St Cuthbert's College with the sinking of a well and laying of a foundation stone. Cuthbert's College was the last school to be personally opened by Woodard himself; Worksop College was officially opened on 5 September 1895, with 5 masters and 44 boys. The land on which the school was built was donated by Henry Pelham-Clinton, 7th Duke of Newcastle, and the drive, which is now tree-lined, was donated by the Duke of Portland. In the early days, buildings were scarce, with only the Great Hall and East Wing complete, plus a temporary chapel. St Cuthbert's Chapel was opened in 1909 after Lord Mountgarret made funds available. Mountgarret did not live to see the finished building; the new building was opened in 1909 by Lady Mountgarret. The early plans for the college chapel were scaled back, due to lack of funds. Cuthbert's College was renamed as Worksop College by Fred Shirley during his time as Headmaster.

Shirley years
Under Shirley, headmaster from 1921 to 1935, the school prospered, and a building programme was undertaken - the Sanatorium, Squash courts, Eton Fives courts (replaced in the 1960s by the chemistry department), staff houses, Old Theatre, Art School, West Wing, and the top storey of the North Wing were all completed. Shirley's plan was to turn Worksop into the Eton of the Midlands. Such was his influence, that a former Prime Minister, Ramsay MacDonald, attended the Speech Day of 1934. By 1935, when Shirley left for King's School, Canterbury, pupil numbers had risen to 500 and the school had gained a good reputation amongst the English Public Schools.

The 1950s and 1960s
The 1950s and 1960s were another period of growth for the college. New buildings from this time included the gym (now demolished), swimming bath (opened in 1954), Churchill Hall Theatre, Chemistry Department and Talbot House (now School House and language department). A new rugby pitch was leveled in 1954; Jeff Butterfield led a Worksop College XV to victory against Worksop RFC in the opening match.

1980 to present
The 1980s and early 1990s were difficult years for Worksop College with pupil numbers falling (as in most public schools in the UK) and little school development. An extension to the Churchill Hall was made in 1981 which would form the newly established Craft and Design Centre. Roger Knight was appointed head in the 1991. Knight left in 1993 to take up a post with the Marylebone Cricket Club and Roy Collard was appointed as headmaster. Not long after Collard started as head, Worksop celebrated its centenary and the Princess Royal opened the new school ICT centre. Other developments included the provision of ICT facilities, refurbishment of dated boarding accommodation, new teaching facilities and the new Sports Hall (opened 2003). In addition, in the last few years, there has been the construction of two astro pitches which allow hockey to be played at a high level. A new girls boarding house was opened in early 2007.

A new Headmaster Gavin Horgan, formerly Deputy Rector of Glasgow Academy, arrived in September 2012. At the same time the prep school came directly under his overall leadership, being renamed Worksop College Preparatory School, Ranby House.

During 2016 and 2017, Worksop College Preparatory School had a brand refresh, updating the logo, school colours and the school name to Worksop College and Ranby House.

After Gavin Horgan's departure in the summer of 2018, Deputy Head of Pastoral, Clare Tilley became the first female Head at Worksop College and Ranby House.

In September 2019, Dr John Price (formerly of fellow Woodard School, St James' School in Grimsby) took over as Head of Worksop College and Prep School, Ranby House.

Houses
As with the majority of independent schools, Worksop College is split into houses. There are a total of 8 houses which are currently open and one which has closed.

Boys' houses
Mason House (formerly Cross, opened in 1895)
Pelham House (formerly Fleur de Lys, opened in 1895)
Talbot House (formerly Crown, opened in 1897)
Shirley House (opened in 1925)

Girls' houses
Derry House (opened in 1978)
Gibbs House (opened in 1986)
School House (opened in 1930, closed in 1986, re-opened in 2007)
Junior house
Portland House (opened in 1948 when Prep moved to Ranby, re-opened as a junior house in 2016)
Closed house
Mountgarret (formerly Lion, opened 1895, closed 1993)

Talbot House
Talbot was one of the original four Dorms when the college opened. Initially, in 1895, with 44 new boys, there were just two Dorms called the Headmaster's Dorm and School Dorm. Before long, as the size of the college grew, so did the number of dorms and quickly two dorms became four, with the addition of Crown and Lion and in 1925, under Canon Shirley they were renamed as Houses. Crown Dorm became Talbot House and was named after the Revd. Arthur Henry Talbot, the second Provost who remained in the post from 1897 to 1927.

The current housemaster of Talbot House is Nathan Hill who started his role in September 2019.

Mason House
Mason was one of the original ‘Four Dormitories’ when the college opened. Initially, in 1895, with 44 new boys, there were only two Dorms, the Headmaster's Dorm and School Dorm. Before long it was decided that the dorms should have emblems to distinguish them and so the Headmaster's Dorm became Cross (from the cross of St. Cuthbert) and School Dorm took the Fleur de Lys, which is on the ends of the arms of St. Cuthbert's cross. As the size of the college grew, so did the number of dorms and quickly two dorms became four and in 1925, under Canon Shirley, they were renamed as Houses. Each House was named after a benefactor and Cross became Mason, after the first Custos William Henry Mason.

Pelham House
Pelham was one of the original Four Dorms when the college opened. Initially, in 1895, with 44 new boys, there were just two Dorms called the Headmaster's Dorm and School Dorm. Before long it was decided that the dorms should have emblems to distinguish them and so the Headmaster's Dorm became Cross (from the cross of St. Cuthbert) and School Dorm took Fleur de Lys, which is on the ends of the arms of St. Cuthbert's cross. As the size of the college grew, so did the number of dorms and quickly two dorms became four and in 1925, under Canon Shirley, they were renamed as Houses. Each House was named after a benefactor and Fleur de Lys became Pelham, the family name of the Duke of Newcastle – who gave the land upon which the school is built. It is an all boys day and boarding house.

Portland House
Portland House was the ‘newest’ of the boys’ houses at Worksop College and was opened in 1953 on the former Preparatory School wing. The name Portland is derived from the Duke of Portland who was a founding benefactor of the college. In 2015, Portland House closed and the boys merged with Pelham House. Re-opening in September 2016, the house is now for boys and girls in Years 7 and 8.

Shirley House
Shirley House was named after Worksop College Headmaster Fred Shirley in 1925. In 2008 after refurbishment and rebuilding the House became a Boys’ Day House.

School House
School House, originally a boys’ boarding house, was re-opened in 2007 as the girls’ Day House. The House crest is the original School House crest, comprising the four crests of the other houses that were in existence when School House was originally founded in 1930.

Derry House
The House is named after Provost Reverend W.R. Derry. Derry House only moved into its present location in the main school buildings during 1993-4 after the closure of Mountgarret House. Girls first attended Worksop College in 1972 as day pupils but at that time they did not have a specific house. However, this changed in 1977 when Derry House was established next to the Health Care Centre.

Gibbs House
Opened in the last 10 years, Gibbs House occupies a purpose built facility on the former site of the 1st XV rugby pitch.

College buildings
Worksop College is a Grade II listed building.
It has many fine buildings styled in Tudor Revival including:

The Great Hall, the centrepiece to Worksop and the first building to be completed. One of the largest rooms in Nottinghamshire, its hammerbeams are spectacular; the original design was based upon Westminster Hall. By R H Carpenter
The Chapel, in gothic revival style opened in 1906. The structure was based upon that of Westminster Abbey and the ceiling contains many passages of Latin verse (specifically these are the words of the Te Deum). By Aston Webb
The East Wing, the first wing of Worksop to be opened, was blessed in 1895 by the Bishop of Southwell.  It was one of the wings added by B D Thompson in 1907, 1928, 1931 and 1934
The Squash Courts were once lit by natural light, but the former roof has now been replaced by a mezzanine ceiling. The courts are an excellent example of early squash courts. The balcony is particularly noteworthy as the courts were designed in back to back format which is quite rare.

Publications
The school published a magazine, the Cuthbertian from 1895 to 1920, when the title was changed to the Worksopian.

Sport

The Dorm Run
The Dorm Run is first mentioned in 1897 as a whole-school paper-chase and was traditionally always run on Shrove Tuesday, however this tradition ceased in the 1950s. The current Dorm Run course is a 3.8 mile route through Clumber Park. Although the course is relatively short from a cross-country perspective, it is difficult due to the undulating terrain. The current Dorm Run record is currently held by Jack Buckner who ran 18:35 in 1980.

Rugby
Rugby was first introduced at Worksop College in 1921. In the early days many College players were capped by the England Public Schools XV - the first being George Laing in 1930. Laing was also 'invited' to play for Blackheath upon completing his studies at Worksop.

The finest seasons of rugby were enjoyed in the late 1930s and early 1940s where the college remained unbeaten for a number of years. Nim Hall was a member of the College 1st XV for three years between 1940 and 1943 and went on to captain England in the early 1950s.

The appointment of England and British Lion Jeff Butterfield in 1954 as a master at the college, quickly led to a surge in success. In 1960 the college rugby sevens team captained by D.E. Tarbatt and coached by Butterfield, reached the final of the Roslyn Park competition, narrowly losing out to the Belfast Acadeemicals in the final.

Hockey
Hockey has been played at Worksop since 1929 when it was introduced as an official sport after being played for a number of years by "enthusiasts" prior to this time. Worksop has been producing national, international and club players ever since those early years.

In the early days, fixtures were mainly played against local clubs and schools with little in the way of tournaments. Later, Worksop took part in the annual Public Schools Hockey Festival (Oxford) for many years. In the late 1990s, Worksop started entering the County Schools competition and found success there. The mid to late 2000s were probably the most successful seasons for hockey at Worksop with the boys 1st XI winning a number of Midland titles and finishing as national semi-finalists in 2006/2007 (losing to Kingston Grammar School) and losing finalists in 2007/2008 (losing to Dean Close School). Success hasn't just been limited to the boys, the girls 1st XI finished runners up to Repton School at the 2009/2010 national finals. Most recently the college under 16 boys finished runners-up to Whitgift School in the National Indoor Championships in 2016.

There are currently three Old Worksopians in the England/Great Britain hockey setup:

Adam Dixon
Sam Ward
Ollie Willars

Athletics
Worksop has produced a number of international athletes over the years:

England Schools champions
P.R. Brunyee (Talbot 1951–1956) - intermediate boys 110y hurdles champion 1955 and senior boys 120y hurdles champion 1956
M. Lambley (Shirley 2001–2006) - junior boys hammer champion 2002, senior boys hammer champion 2005

Junior AAA champions
W. Heath (Pelham 1926–1931) - 100y and 220y champion 1931
 W.B. Thompson (Mountgarret 1949–1954) - 200y low hurdles champion 1954
J.R. Buckner (Talbot 1975–1980) - 1500m champion 1980

Senior AAA champion
J.R. Buckner - 5000m 1986 and 1992, 10k road 1985

Olympians
J.R. Buckner - Seoul 1988, 5th place 5000m and Barcelona 1992, semi finals 5000m
T.C. Buckner (Talbot 1976–1981) - Barcelona 1992, semi-finals 3000m steeplechase

Commonwealth/Empire Games
P.R. Brunyee - Cardiff 1958, heats 120y hurdles
D.M.W. Griffiths (Mason 1954–1960) - Perth 1962, heats 880y and mile
J.R. Buckner - Edinburgh 1986, silver 5000m
T.C. Buckner - Victoria 1994, 5th 3000m steeplechase
M. Lambley - Delhi 2010, qualifying hammer

European Championships
J.R. Buckner - Stuttgart 1986, champion 5000m (championship best performance)
W.R.G Foster (Portland 1971–1975) - Helsinki 1994, 31st marathon

Other representatives
M.P. Hay (Mountgarret 1968–1973) - GB under 23 decathlon 1975
S.T. Lewis (Shirley 1988–1993) - Wales junior 3000m steeplechase 1993
S.D. Heggie (Portland 1989–1994) - GB Under 23 400m 1994

Preparatory School

 Ranby House is a co-educational independent preparatory, day and boarding, school for boys and girls aged 3 to 11. The school is the feeder to Worksop College which is located five miles away. The school currently has around 260 pupils and the Headmaster is David Thorpe. The school has two main parts, the 'Pre-Prep' (3–7 years of age) and the 'Prep School'. The 'Prep School' is then divided further into the four groups or houses: St Alban; St Benedict; St Columba; and St Dunstan.

Former pupils of the school include British actor and dancer Richard Winsor, GB hammer thrower Matthew Lambley and Katie Walter, the youngest person to go on an expedition to the South Pole in 2009.

History
Ranby House was the property of Sir Albert Bingham who was from a family of wealthy Sheffield steelmasters.  Following Sir Albert's death, the house and the Elkesley estate were sold at auction in May 1948.  The house was bought by Col. H.H. Storey on behalf of the Woodard School Trust.   As well as the house and stables the Trust also bought  of grounds, park and woodland. The school opened in October 1948 with 42 boys.

The estate was originally purchased due to the "Prep" at Worksop College reaching 90 pupils and exceeding the capacity of the Prep Wing (now Portland House). There were at first joint headmasters, George Clayton and William Adler. Clayton retired in 1953. There was only accommodation for 30 boys at Ranby, so the remaining 60 stayed at the college until the remainder finally moved over in 1953. At Ranby the coach-house and stables were converted into the chapel with an organ being installed in 1962. As new classrooms were constructed in the quadrangle, those in the house became dormitories and pupil numbers rose.

It was announced in April 2011 that the school was to benefit from a £500,000 investment in the development of the school over the next two years. The plan was to spend the money on classroom development and state-of-the-art teaching equipment.

In 2016 the Governors of Worksop College announced that they planned to close the Ranby House site and transfer the operation to a purpose-built building within the college's main site in Worksop.  The Ranby property was placed on the market in the summer of 2017; it was still on the market as of summer 2018, and in autumn 2019 it was announced that the relocation plan would not go ahead.

Old Worksopians

Former students of Worksop College are referred to as Old Worksopians.

Notable masters
 Fred Shirley – Headmaster 1921 to 1935 
 Jeff Butterfield - Captain of England rugby team in the 1950s
 Ken Farnes - England fast bowler in the 1930s
 Alan Old - England rugby fly half 1972–1978

See also
Listed buildings in Worksop

References

External links

Profile on the ISC website
Old Worksopian Society
Woodard Schools website

Woodard Schools
Anglo-Catholic educational establishments
Educational institutions established in 1890
Member schools of the Headmasters' and Headmistresses' Conference
Private schools in Nottinghamshire
Boarding schools in Nottinghamshire
 
1890 establishments in England
Church of England private schools in the Diocese of Southwell and Nottingham
Worksop
Sherwood Forest